Deroca hidda is a moth of the family Drepanidae first described by Swinhoe in 1900. It is found in India, Myanmar, China and Taiwan.

Subspecies
Deroca hidda hidda
Deroca hidda ampla Inoue, 1988 (Taiwan)
Deroca hidda bifida Watson, 1957 (northern India, China: northern Yunnan)

References

Moths described in 1900
Drepaninae